People with the surname Bodansky include:
 Artur Bodanzky (1877–1939), Austrian-American conductor
 Laís Bodanzky (born 1969), Brazilian film director
 Robert Bodanzky (1879–1923), Austrian journalist, playwright and poet
 Yossef Bodansky, Israeli-American political scientist
 Aaron Bodansky (1887–1960), Russian-born American biochemist